Chiswick House is a Neo-Palladian style villa in the Chiswick district of London, England. A "glorious" example of Neo-Palladian architecture in west London, the house was designed and built by Richard Boyle, 3rd Earl of Burlington (1694–1753), and completed in 1729. The house and garden occupy . The garden was created mainly by the architect and landscape designer William Kent, and it is one of the earliest examples of the English landscape garden.

After the death of the 3rd Earl of Burlington in 1753, and the subsequent deaths of his last surviving daughter (Charlotte Boyle) in 1754 and his widow in 1758, the property was ceded to William Cavendish, 4th Duke of Devonshire, Charlotte's husband. After William's death in 1764, the villa passed to his and Charlotte's orphaned young son, William Cavendish, 5th Duke of Devonshire. His wife, Georgiana Spencer, a prominent and controversial figure in fashion and politics whom he married in 1774, used the house as a retreat and as a Whig stronghold for many years; it was the place of death of Charles James Fox in 1806. Prime Minister George Canning also died there in 1827 (in a bedroom in the John White wing buildings).

During the 19th century, the house fell into decline and was rented out by the Cavendish family. It was used as a mental hospital, the Chiswick Asylum, from 1892. In 1929, the 9th Duke of Devonshire sold Chiswick House to Middlesex County Council, and it became a fire station. The villa suffered damage during World War II, and in 1944, a V-2 rocket damaged one of the two wings, which were both demolished in 1956. Today, the house is a Grade I listed building and is maintained by English Heritage.

History

Early history (c.1610–1682)

The original Chiswick House was a Jacobean house owned by Sir Edward Wardour, and possibly built by his father. It is dated c. 1610 in a late 17th-century engraving of the Chiswick House estate by Jan Kip and Leonard Knyff, and was constructed with four sides around an open courtyard. Wardour sold the house in 1624 to Robert Carr, 1st Earl of Somerset. The house was quite large: in the 1664 Hearth Tax documents it is recorded as having 33 fireplaces. The house was at the south end of the Royalist line in the Battle of Turnham Green (1641), during the First English Civil War. The house was purchased by Charles Boyle, 3rd Viscount Dungarvan in 1682.

Boyle family (1682–1758)

The Jacobean house was used by the Boyle family as a summer retreat from their central London home, Burlington House. After a fire in 1725, Richard Boyle, 3rd Earl of Burlington (Lord Burlington), then head of the family, decided to build a new "villa" to the west of the old Chiswick House.

During his trip to Italy in 1719, Burlington had acquired a passion for Palladian architecture. He had not closely inspected Roman ruins or made detailed drawings on the sites in Italy; he relied on Palladio and Scamozzi as his interpreters of the classic tradition. Another source of his inspiration were drawings he collected, including those of Palladio himself, which had belonged to Inigo Jones and his pupil John Webb. According to Howard Colvin, "Burlington's mission was to reinstate in Augustan England the canons of Roman architecture as described by Vitruvius, exemplified by its surviving remains, and practised by Palladio, Scamozzi and Jones."

Burlington, himself a talented amateur architect and (in the words of Horace Walpole) "Apollo of the Arts", designed the villa with the aid of William Kent, who also took a leading role in designing the gardens. Burlington built the villa with enough space to house his art collection, regarded as containing "some of the best pictures in Europe", and his more select pieces of furniture, some of which was purchased on his first Grand Tour of Europe in 1714. Construction of the villa took place between 1726 and 1729.

After Burlington's death in 1753, his wife, Lady Dorothy Savile, and daughter, Charlotte, who had married William Cavendish, 4th Duke of Devonshire in 1748, inherited the house.  Charlotte died in December 1754, and Lady Burlington died in September 1758. Several views of Burlington's house were made by the architect-draughtsman John Donowell around this time.

Cavendish family (1758–1929)

After the death of Lady Burlington in 1758, the villa and gardens passed to the Cavendish family. William Cavendish died in 1764, leaving the property to his son William, the 5th Duke of Devonshire. In 1774, William married Lady Georgiana Spencer, the Duchess of Devonshire, who enjoyed spending time at Chiswick which she referred to as her "earthly paradise". She regularly invited members of the Whig party to the house for tea parties in the garden. In 1788 the Cavendish family demolished the Jacobean house and hired architect John White to add two wings to the villa to increase the amount of accommodation. The duchess was responsible for the building of the Classical Bridge in 1774, designed by the architect James Wyatt, and the planting of roses on the walls of the new wings and the sides of the buildings. She died in 1806.

In 1813, a  conservatory was built by Samuel Ware, with the purpose of housing exotic fruits and camellias. > Gardener Lewis Kennedy built an Italian inspired geometric garden around the conservatory. In 1827, after a rapid decline in health, Tory Prime Minister George Canning died in the same room where Charles James Fox had died in 1806.

Between 1862 and 1892 the villa was rented by the Cavendish family to a number of successive tenants, including the Duchess of Sutherland in 1867, the Prince of Wales in the 1870s, and John Crichton-Stuart, 3rd Marquess of Bute, patron of the architect William Burges, from 1881 to 1892.

Chiswick Asylum (1892–1928)

From 1892, the 9th Duke of Devonshire rented the villa to Doctors Thomas Seymour and Charles Molesworth Tuke (sons of Thomas Harrington Tuke), and it was used by them as a mental hospital, the Chiswick Asylum, for wealthy male and female patients until 1928. The asylum was praised for its relatively compassionate approach to its inmates. The wings of the house used for the asylum were demolished in the 1950s so little now remains of this use, except in archival records. In 1897, the two sphinxes on the main gate were removed to Green Park during the celebrations of Queen Victoria's Diamond Jubilee. They were never returned.

Public ownership (1929–present)

The 9th Duke of Devonshire sold Chiswick House to Middlesex County Council in 1929,  the purchase price being met in part by contributions from public subscribers, including King George V. The villa became a fire station during World War II, and suffered damage; vibration from the bombing of Chiswick brought down the plasterwork in the Upper Tribunal, and on 8 September 1944 a V-2 rocket damaged one of the two wings. The wings were removed in 1956.

In 1948, extensive lobbying from the newly created Georgian Group prevented it from being destroyed. The house came under the aegis of the Ministry of Works and subsequently of English Heritage.

Hounslow Council and English Heritage formed the Chiswick House and Gardens Trust in 2005 to unify the management of the villa and gardens. The trust took over the administration for the villa and gardens in July 2010, following the completion of the restoration works. A Heritage Lottery Fund Grant was complemented by approximately £4 million from other sources, for restoration of the gardens in 2007. The garden is open to the public from dawn until dusk without charge.

Villa building

Chiswick House was an attempt by Lord Burlington to create a Roman villa, rather than a Renaissance pastiche, situated in a symbolic Roman garden. Chiswick Villa is inspired in part by several buildings of the 16th-century Italian architects Andrea Palladio and his assistant Vincenzo Scamozzi. The house is often said to be directly inspired by Palladio's Villa Capra "La Rotonda" near Vicenza, as architect Colen Campbell had offered Lord Burlington a design for a villa closely based on the Villa Capra for his use at Chiswick. However, although this was clearly influential, Lord Burlington rejected this design; it was subsequently used at Mereworth Castle, Kent. Lord Burlington's library list at Chiswick shows that he was not restricted to the influence of Andrea Palladio. He owned books by influential Italian Renaissance architects such as Sebastiano Serlio and Leon Battista Alberti, and his library contained books by French architects, sculptors, illustrators and architectural theorists like Jean Cotelle, Philibert de l'Orme, Abraham Bosse, Jean Bullant, Salomon de Caus, Roland Fréart de Chambray, Hugues Sambin, Antoine Desgodetz, and John James's translation of Claude Perrault's Treatise of the Five Orders. Whether Palladio's work inspired Chiswick or not, the Renaissance architect exerted an important influence on Lord Burlington through his plans and reconstructions of lost Roman buildings; many of these, unpublished and little known, were purchased by Burlington on his second Grand Tour and housed in the Blue Velvet Room, which served as his study. These reconstructions were the source for many of the varied geometric shapes within Burlington's Villa, including the use of the octagon, circle and rectangle (with apses). Possibly the most influential building reconstructed by Palladio and used at Chiswick was the monumental Roman Baths of Diocletian: references to this building can be found in the Domed Hall, Gallery, Library and Link rooms.

Burlington's use of Roman sources can also be seen in the steep-pitched dome of the villa, which is derived from the Pantheon in Rome. However, the source for the octagonal form of the dome, the Upper Tribunal, Lower Tribunal and cellar at Chiswick may be Vincenzo Scamozzi's Rocca Pisana near Vicenza. Burlington may also have been influenced in his choice of octagon by the drawings of the Renaissance architect Sebastiano Serlio (1475–1554), or by Roman buildings of antiquity (for example, Lord Burlington owned Andrea Palladio's drawings of the octagonal mausoleum at Diocletian's Palace, Split in modern Croatia).

The brick-built Villa's facade is faced in Portland stone, with a small amount of stucco. The finely carved Corinthian capitals on the projecting six-column portico, carved by John Boson, are derived from the Temple of Castor and Pollux in Rome. The inset door, projecting plinth and 'v'-necked rusticated vermiculation (resembling tufa) were all derived from the base of Trajan's Column. The short sections of crenellated wall with ball finials which extend out either side of the villa were symbolic of medieval (or Roman) fortified town walls, and were inspired by their use by Palladio at his church of San Giorgio Maggiore in Venice and by Inigo Jones (1573–1652) (Palladio produced woodcuts of the Villa Foscari with crenellated sections of walls in his I quattro libri dell'architettura in 1570, yet they were never built). To reinforce this link, two full-length statues of Palladio and Jones by the celebrated Flemish-born sculptor John Michael Rysbrack (1694–1770) are positioned in front of these sections of wall. Palladio's influence is also felt in the general cubic form of the villa with its central hall with other rooms leading off its axis. However, the decorative cornice at Chiswick was derived from a contemporary source, that of James Gibbs's cornice at the Church of St Martin-in-the-Fields, London.

On the portico leading to the Domed Hall is positioned a bust of the Roman Emperor Augustus. Augustus was regarded by many of the early 18th-century English aristocracy as the greatest of all the Roman Emperors (the early Georgian era was known as the Augustan Age). This link with the Emperor Augustus was reinforced in the garden at Chiswick through the presence of Egyptianizing objects such as sphinxes (who symbolically guard the 'Temple' front and rear), obelisks and stone lions. Lord Burlington and his contemporaries were conscious of the fact that it was Augustus who invaded Egypt and brought back Egyptian objects and erected them in Rome. The influence of Rome manifested itself at Chiswick through Burlington's strategic deployment of statues, including those of a Borghese gladiator, a Venus de' Medici, a wolf (used to inspire nostalgic memories of the legendary founders of Rome, Romulus and Remus), a goat (symbolising the zodiac of Capricorn, the birth sign of the Emperor Augustus) and a boar located at the rear of the villa (symbolic of the great boar hunt). Inside the villa many references to the Roman goddess Venus abound, as she was the mother of Aeneas who fled Troy and co-founded Rome. On the forecourt to the villa are several 'term' statues that derive their forms from Terminus, the Roman god of distance and space. These are used as boundary markers, positioned in the hedge at set distances apart.

At the rear of the villa were positioned 'herm' statues that derive from the Greek god Hermes, the patron of travellers; these are welcoming figures for all who wish to visit Lord Burlington's gardens (Lord Burlington's gardens at Chiswick were the most visited of all London villas. A small entrance charge applied).

The house when built was described by John, Lord Hervey as "Too small to live in, and too big to hang to a watch". John Clerk of Penicuik described it as "Rather curious than convenient", while Horace Walpole called it "the beautiful model". It is possible that one purpose of the villa was as an art gallery, as inventories show more than 167 paintings hanging at Chiswick House in Lord Burlington's lifetime, many purchased on his two grand tours of Europe.

Gardens

The gardens at Chiswick were an attempt to symbolically recreate a garden of ancient Rome; these were believed to have followed the form of the gardens of Greece. The gardens, like the villa, were inspired by the architecture and gardens of ancient Rome, such as the Emperor Hadrian's Villa Adriana at Tivoli, from which the three statues at the end of the exedra (according to Daniel Defoe) were alleged to have come.

The gardens at Chiswick were originally of a standard Jacobean design, but from the 1720s they were in a constant state of transition. Burlington and Kent experimented with new designs, incorporating such diverse elements as mock fortifications, a Ha-ha, classical fabriques, statues, groves, faux Egyptian objects, bowling greens, winding walks, cascades and water features.

Authors of antiquity, such as Horace and Pliny, were major influences on 18th century thinkers through their descriptions of their own gardens, with alleys shaded by trees, parterres, topiary, and fountains. The first architect of the gardens at Chiswick appears to have been the king's gardener, Charles Bridgeman, who was believed to have worked on the gardens with Lord Burlington around 1720, and subsequently with William Kent, whom Lord Burlington had brought back with him on his return from his second Grand Tour in 1719. William Kent was inspired by the landscape paintings of the French artists Nicolas Poussin and Claude Lorrain. The poet Alexander Pope (who had his own villa with gardens in nearby Twickenham), was involved, and was responsible for confirming Lord Burlington's belief that Roman and Greek gardens were largely "informal" affairs, with nature ruled by God.

Evidence for this belief was provided through his translation into English of Homer's cornerstones of European literature The Iliad and The Odyssey which provided brief glimpses of Greek gardens which gave validation to Burlington's belief in the naturalistic appearance of Roman gardens. Theatrical aspects were added to the gardens by William Kent, who studied the theatre and masque designs of Inigo Jones for the Stuart Court, which were owned by Lord Burlington and housed within his villa. Burlington, Kent and Pope were informed by the writings of Anthony Ashley Cooper who advocated "variety" in a garden, but not complete deformalisation.

The gardens at Chiswick were filled with fabriques (garden buildings) which illustrated Lord Burlington's knowledge of Roman, Greek, Egyptian and Renaissance architecture, and statues and architecture which expressed his Whig (and very possibly Jacobite) ideals.

Lord Burlington's garden at Chiswick was one of the first to include garden buildings and ancient statues which were to symbolically evoke the mood and appearance of ancient Rome. Soon after other English gardens such as Stourhead, Stowe, West Wycombe, Holkham, and Rousham were to follow suit, creating a type of garden which eventually would become known internationally as the English Landscape Garden. Lord Burlington's gardens at Chiswick had a number of these fabriques including the Ionic Temple, Bagnio, Pagan Temple, Rustic House, and two Deer Houses.

Beyond the exedra in the gardens lies an area known as the 'Orange Tree Garden' in which was situated a small garden building known as the Ionic Temple. The Ionic Temple is circular in form and is derived from either the Pantheon in Rome or possibly from the Temple of Romulus. The portico of this temple is derived from the Temple of Portunus which William Kent illustrates in the ceiling of the Red Velvet Room within the Villa. Immediately in front of the Temple lies a circular pool of water with a small obelisk positioned in its centre. Around the base of the pool of water are three concentric rings of raised grass conforming originally to a 3:4:5 ratio echoing the dimensions of the Red and Green Velvet Room within the Villa. A second obelisk was erected at the centre of another patte d'oie ('Goose Foot', a set of paths converging at a point) beyond the cascade to the west of the Villa.

A theatre of hedges known as an exedra was designed by William Kent and originally displayed ancient statues of three unknown Roman gentlemen. These three statues were later speculatively 'identified' by the writer Daniel Defoe (1659–1731) as Caesar (100–44 BC) and Pompey (106–48 BC) responsible for the decline of the Roman republic, facing a statue of Cicero (106–43 BC), the defender of the Republic. In 1733 Lord Burlington resigned his positions within the government and went into active opposition against Robert Walpole, Britain's first Prime Minister who Burlington regarded as corrupting British politics and Whig values. However, it was the figures of the poets Horace, Homer and Virgil, the philosopher Socrates, and the leaders Lucius Verus and Lycurgus which once graced the exedra whose political message was one of democracy and anti-tyranny. (William Kent made a similar statement against Walpole for Lord Cobham. The original design by William Kent for the end of the exedra was a stone 'Temple of Worthies' which was rejected by Lord Burlington, but subsequently used by Lord Cobham at Stowe).

William Kent added a cascade (a symbolic grotto), inspired by the upper cascade of the gardens of the Villa Aldobrandini. Kent's garden also featured a flower garden, an orchard, an aviary (which included an owl) and a symmetrical planned arrangement of trees known as the "Grove". To the side of the Grove was a patte d'oie, or 'Goosefoot', three avenues which terminated by buildings including the 'Bagnio' (or Casino, designed by Lord Burlington and Colen Campbell) in 1716, the 'Pagan Temple' (designed by the Catholic Baroque architect James Gibbs) and the Rustic House (designed by Lord Burlington).

Terminating one end of the Ha-ha stands a Deer House designed by Lord Burlington. A second Deer House once stood at the opposite end of the Ha-ha until replaced by Inigo Jones' gateway in 1738 (see below). Both Deer Houses featured pyramidal roofs and characteristic 'Vitruvian' doors; a feature that comes directly from Palladio's woodcuts from his I quattro libri dell'architettura of 1570. Immediately behind the ha-ha and positioned between the two Deer Houses was a building known as the Orangery, which, as its name suggests, originally housed Lord Burlington's orange trees over the cold winter period (some of these trees were once positioned around the perimeter of the Ionic Temple). Part of the floor of this building was laid out in imitation of a Roman mosaic which English Heritage archaeologists in 2009 dated to the mid 18th century. Next to the remaining Deer Houses stands the Doric column on which was placed a statue of the Venus di' Medici.

In the eighteenth century statues of Venus were the most common statue in a garden as it was known that the goddess Venus was the protector of gardens and gardeners. The statue that can be seen on the Doric column today is a copy in Portland stone and was commissioned by the Chiswick House Friends in 2009. Other statues that Lord Burlington had made for the gardens included a wolf, a boar, a goat, a lion and lioness, a statue of the Roman god Mercury, a gladiator, Hercules, and Cain and Abel.

The lawn at the rear of the house was created by 1745 and planted with young Cedar of Lebanon trees which alternate with stone funerary urns designed by William Kent. Placed between the urns and the Cedar of Lebanon are three more sphinxes orientated to face the rising sun.

A lake was created around 1727 by widening the Bollo Brook. The excess soil was then heaped up behind William Kent's cascade to produce an elevated walkway for people to admire the gardens and a view of the nearby River Thames. A gateway designed by Inigo Jones in 1621 at Beaufort House in Chelsea (home of Sir Hans Sloane) was bought and removed by Lord Burlington and rebuilt in the gardens at Chiswick in 1738.

Lord Burlington is sometimes said to have been influenced by largely informal Chinese gardens, but the flavour of the Orient was not evoked in Burlington's classically inspired gardens, which were universally Roman in outlook. Unlike Stowe, with its Temple of Worthies and busts such as the Black Prince, Queen Elizabeth I and Shakespeare, Burlington's gardens at Chiswick did not romance or mythologise England's illustrious past. This was possibly due to Burlington's intense dislike of the Gothic style which he regarded as barbaric and backward.

Lord Burlington's gardens at Chiswick were one of the most painted of English gardens in the 18th century. The Flemish painter Pieter Andreas Rijsbrack (brother of John Michael Rysbrack) was commissioned to paint a series of eight paintings to record the transformation of the garden from formal Jacobean to informal picturesque at the end of the 1750s. Together with copies of a second set these paintings today hang in the Green Velvet Room. Other artists who were commissioned to record the appearance of the gardens were England's first landscape painter George Lambert (1700–1765), the French painter Jacques Rigaud (1681–1754) and the cartographer John Rocque (1709–1762) who produced an engraved survey of Chiswick in 1736 showing the Villa and many of its garden buildings.

The walled gardens were originally part of a house owned by Sir Stephen Fox in the 17th century. In the early 19th century the house and gardens became part of the Chiswick House estate. Fox's house was demolished, though the gardens were kept.

Later developments

The Classic Bridge located beyond the Orange Tree Garden was built for Georgiana Spencer. It was constructed in 1774 to the designs of James Wyatt. Alterations were made to the gardens in 1778 by the fifth Duke of Devonshire and included the demolition of the Casina in 1778 and the pulling down of the Gibbs Pagan Temple by 1784. Richard Hewlings states that the reason for such actions was not neglect but rather: "it was a change of taste, away from artificial temples located within a geometrically ordered plan". In 1784 the Duke engaged Samuel Lapidge, a landscape designer who had previously worked under Lancelot 'Capability' Brown, to make further changes to the garden, including the filling in of the northern rectangular pond. The Sixth Duke of Devonshire (the 'Bachelor' Duke) obtained permission in 1813 to relocate Burlington Road beyond the two piers at the front of the forecourt to its present position.

The gardens of Little Moreton Hall, an adjoining property to the east, were added in 1812, the hall itself being demolished. In that same year the Italian Garden was laid out on the newly acquired grounds to a design by Lewis Kennedy. The conservatory adjoining the Italian Garden was completed in 1813, and at 96m was the longest at that time. A collection of camellias is housed in the conservatory, some of which have survived from 1828 to this day.

The garden designer Joseph Paxton, creator of the Crystal Palace, started his career in the gardens at Chiswick for the Royal Horticultural Society before his talents were recognised by William Cavendish, the sixth Duke of Devonshire and he relocated as head gardener to Chatsworth House, Derbyshire.

Freemasonry

Chiswick House has been linked with Freemasonry, and is believed by some scholars to have functioned as a private Masonic Lodge or Temple (unaffiliated to Grand Lodge), given that many of the ceiling paintings by William Kent in the Gallery and the Red, Blue and Summer Parlour Rooms contain iconography of a strong Masonic, Hermetic, and possible Jacobite character. The proportions of several of the upstairs rooms also have significance in relation to biblical buildings important in Freemasonry. Lord Burlington's status as an important Freemason is indicated by his inclusion in the Freemason's Pocket Companion of 1736 and in a poem in James Anderson's Constitutions of the Free-Masons of 1723 where he is linked to an illustrious line of personalities important in Masonic lore. Pat Rogers has argued (following the original research of Jane Clark) that Chiswick House was a symbolic temple, based on so-called Royal Arch Freemasonry, involving a Hermetic intervention designed to heal the sufferings of the exiled Jews. Lord Burlington's hand written list of titles in his library at Chiswick also shows that he supported a large number of publications by Freemasons. 
After completion of the villa in 1729, Burlington later provided inspiration to other architects for numerous other buildings, such as Thomas Coke, 1st Earl of Leicester at Holkham Hall, Norfolk Charles Lennox, 2nd Duke of Richmond, at Goodwood House, and the Mansion House, nicknamed the "Egyptian Hall" for its columns. Both Coke and Lennox were prominent Freemasons and adopted Masonic characteristics and themes on their properties.

Notable guests 

Although little is known of the people who stayed or visited the house in Lord Burlington's lifetime, many important visitors to the property are recorded as visiting throughout its history. These included leading figures of the European 'Enlightenment' including the philosophers Voltaire (1694–1778) and Jean-Jacques Rousseau (1712–1778); the future US Presidents John Adams (1735–1826) and Thomas Jefferson (1743–1826); Benjamin Franklin (1706–1790); the German landscape artist Prince Hermann von Pückler-Muskau; the Italian statesman Giuseppe Garibaldi (1807–1882); Russian Tsars Nicholas I (1796–1855) and Alexander I (1777–1825); the king of Persia; Queen Victoria (1819–1901) and Prince Albert of Saxe-Coburg (1819–61); Sir Walter Scott (1771–1832); Prince Leopold III, Duke of Anhalt-Dessau (1740–1817); Prime Ministers William Ewart Gladstone (1809–1898) and Sir Robert Walpole (1676–1745); Queen Caroline of Brandenburg-Ansbach (1683–1737); John Stuart, 3rd Earl of Bute (1713–92) and the architect William Burges (1827–1881).

On 20 May 1966, the Beatles visited Chiswick House to shoot promotional films for both sides of their latest 45 RPM single, "Paperback Writer" and "Rain". There are scenes shot in the conservatory, in the walled garden and by the exedra.

Events 

Since the restoration of the gardens, a variety of seasonal events have been held in the gardens of Chiswick House each year, including a Camellia show, open days in the walled kitchen garden, a circus, and a magic lantern festival.

Notes

References

Further reading

Bibliography

 
 Barnard, Toby & Clark, Jane (eds.), Lord Burlington. Architecture, Art and Life, (London: The Hambledon Press, 1995)
 Clegg, Gillian, Chiswick House and Gardens: A History, (London: McHugh Publications, 2011)
 Harris, John, The Palladian Revival: Lord Burlington, His Villa and Garden at Chiswick, (New Haven: Yale University Press, 1994)
 
 White, Roger, Chiswick House and Gardens, (English Heritage guide book, 2001)

Periodicals

 Bryant, Julius, "Chiswick House-the inside story. Policies and problems of restoration", in Apollo magazine, CXXXVI, 1992, 17–22
 Cornforth, John, "Chiswick House, London", in Country Life, 16 February 1995, 32–37
 Fellows, David, "This old house. Excavations at Chiswick House", in Current Archaeology, Number 223, October 2008, 20–29
 Hewlings, Richard, "Palladio in England. Chiswick House, London", in Country Life, 28 January 2009, 46–51
 Hewlings, Richard, "The Statues of Inigo Jones and Palladio at Chiswick House", in English Heritage Historical Review, Volume 2, 2007, 71–83
 Hewlings, Richard, "The Link Room at Chiswick House. Lord Burlington as antiquarian", in Apollo magazine, CXLI, 1995, 28–29
 Kingsbury, Pamela D., "The Tradition of the Soffitto Veneziano in Lord Burlington's Suburban Villa in Chiswick", in Architectural History, Volume 44, 2001, 145–152
 Rosoman, Treve, "The Decoration and Use of the Principal Apartments of Chiswick House, 1727–70", in The Burlington Magazine, Volume 127, Number 991, October 1985, 663–677
 Spence, R.T, "Chiswick House and its gardens", in The Burlington Magazine, Volume 135, Number 1085, August 1993, 525–531
 Scanlan, Matthew, "A Masonic Temple in West London?", in Freemasonry Today, Winter 2006/7, Issue 39, 32–34
 Carre, Jacques, "Lord Burlington's Garden at Chiswick", in Garden History, Volume 1, Number 3, Summer 1973, 23–30
 Clegg, Gillian, "The Duke of Devonshire's Menagerie at Chiswick House", in Richard Hewlings (eds.) English Heritage Historical Review, Volume 3, 2008, 123–127
 Harris, John, "Is Chiswick a 'Palladian' Garden?", in Garden History, Volume 32, No.1, Spring 2004, 124–136
 Jacques, David, "What to Do about Earlier Inaccurate Restoration: A Case Study of Chiswick House", in APT Bulletin, Volume 24, Number 3/4, Conserving Historic Landscapes, 1992, 4–13
 Sicca, Cinzia Maria, "Lord Burlington at Chiswick: Architecture and Landscape", in Garden History, Volume 10, Number 1, Spring 1982, 36–69

External links

 Chiswick House and Gardens Trust
 Chiswick House Friends
 Images of Chiswick House at the Country Life Picture Library
 Secret Symbolism

Country houses in London
Houses in the London Borough of Hounslow
Art museums and galleries in London
Chiswick
Grade I listed parks and gardens in London
Historic house museums in London
Museums in the London Borough of Hounslow
Parks and open spaces in the London Borough of Hounslow
1729 establishments in England
Houses completed in 1729
English Heritage sites in London
Grade I listed buildings in the London Borough of Hounslow
Grade I listed houses in London
Grade I listed museum buildings
History of the London Borough of Hounslow
History of Middlesex
Neoclassical architecture in London
Palladian architecture in England
Villas in the United Kingdom
Domes
Gardens by William Kent